Supercell is a 2023 American disaster action film directed by Herbert James Winterstern from a  screenplay that he wrote with Anna Elizabeth James. It stars Skeet Ulrich, Anne Heche, Daniel Diemer, Jordan Kristine Seamón and Alec Baldwin.

It was released in theaters and video on demand on March 17, 2023.

Plot
A young man lives up to his parents' legacy to witness and chase storms with his friends and family out to save him.

Cast
 Skeet Ulrich as Roy
 Anne Heche as Quinn
 Daniel Diemer as William
 Jordan Kristine Seamón as Harper
 Alec Baldwin as Zane
 Anjul Nigam as Ramesh
 Michael Klingher as Chuck
 Jane Lind as May
 Richard Gunn as Bill
 Praya Lundberg as Amy

Production
Principal photography occurred in Moultrie, Georgia in June 2021, as well as Lavina, Montana and Hardin, Montana in May 2021.

Release
Supercell was released simultaneously in theaters and video on-demand on March 17, 2023, by Saban Films.

References

External links
 

American epic films
American disaster films
American action films
Films shot in Georgia (U.S. state)
Disaster action films